The Unified Deep Water System of European Russia or UDWS is a system of inland waterways in Russia linking the White Sea, the Baltic Sea, the Volga River, Moscow, the Caspian Sea and—via the Sea of Azov—the Black Sea. In 2010, UDWS carried 70 million tons of cargo and 12 million passengers, making up two-thirds of overall inland waterway traffic volume in Russia. There are 60 common-use ports and quays in the UDWS, including three international ports (two in Moscow and one in Dmitrov, Moscow Oblast), so Moscow is sometimes called "the port of the five seas".

There are plans to increase depth of these sections to 4 m.

The system includes these waterways:
Neva River
Lake Ladoga
Svir River
Lake Onega
Volga–Baltic Waterway — connects Lake Onega to the Volga River; built in the early 19th century as Mariinsk Canal System and rebuilt in 1956–1964
White Sea–Baltic Canal — connects Lake Onega to the White Sea; constructed in 1931–1933
Moscow Canal — connects Moscow to the Volga River; constructed in 1932–1937
Volga River
Kama River
Belaya River
Volga–Don Canal — connects the Volga River to the Don River; constructed in 1948–1952
Don River

Lock dimensions
A limiting factor for the size of vessels that can use the waterways are the dimensions of the locks. They somewhat vary throughout the system. In particular, the route from St Petersburg to Rybinsk Dam (via the Volga-Baltic Waterway) accommodates vessels with the length of up to 170 m, the width of up to 16.8 m, and the draught of up to 3.6 m, with the space of at least 14.6 m available under bridges. From the Rybinsk Dam to the mouth of the Volga (Streletskoye), the guaranteed sizes are length  280 m, width 28.50 m, draught 3.10 m, with at least 11.70 m of space available under bridges.

Environmental impact
In 1999, the warty comb jelly colonized the Caspian Sea via the UDWS. The establishment of this population led to a 60% reduction in the number of sprat, which in turn led to a reduction in the population of sturgeon and seals.

In total, according to the unified federal/state agency CaspNIRKh, about 60 alien species of plants and animals penetrated into the Caspian Sea in the 20th century, which has led to significant changes to ecosystems.

See also
Don–Volga-Portage
Eurasia Canal 
Classification of European Inland Waterways
Baltimax (15.2m draft, as NeoPanamax)
Bangkok Port (8.2m draft)
Seawaymax (United States Great Lakes docks, 8.1m draft), Chesapeake & Delaware Canal (draft 10.7m)
Paraguay River (almost 2.5m in middle river, 1.6m in upper river)
Grand Canal (China)
Saimaa Canal (Finland, max length 82.5m, beam 12.6m, draft 4.2m)

References

Water transport in Russia

External links
Russia Waterways map
Siberaian pre-railroad waterways-routes